Seriton Benny Fernandes (born 26 October 1992), is an Indian professional footballer who plays as a defender for Goa in the Indian Super League and the India national team.

Career
Born in Goa, Fernandes started his career with the Dempo youth set-up. After leaving Dempo, Fernandes played with both Laxmi Prasad and Churchill Brothers in the Goa Professional League.

Before the 2015–16 I-League season, Fernandes was loaned to Sporting Goa. He made his professional debut for the club on 6 February 2016 against Bengaluru. He started the match and played 70 minutes as Sporting Goa won the match 2–1.

On 8 July 2016, it was announced that Fernandes had signed on permanently with Sporting Goa. Seriton then was selected by Derick Periera to play for Goa for the 2017-18 Indian Super League season. He has also appeared with Goa in the 2021 AFC Champions League.

Career statistics

Club

International

Honours

Club 
FC Goa
Indian Super Cup: 2019
 Indian Super League Premiers: 2019–20
 Durand Cup: 2021

International 

 India

 SAFF Championship: 2021

References

Living people
Indian footballers
India international footballers
Dempo SC players
Churchill Brothers FC Goa players
Sporting Clube de Goa players
Association football midfielders
Footballers from Goa
I-League players
1992 births
Indian Super League players
FC Goa players